7mate is an Australian free-to-air digital television multichannel, which was launched by the Seven Network on 25 September 2010. The channel contains sport and regular programs aimed primarily to a male audience, with programming drawn from a combination of new shows, American network shows and other shows previously aired on its sister channels Seven, 7two and 7flix.

Due to the rebroadcast of 7HD on 10 May 2016, 7mate was reduced to a standard definition broadcast in Melbourne and Adelaide. Sydney, Brisbane and Perth instead received a HD simulcast of 7mate until December 2016, with breakaway programming used from that point to broadcast AFL matches in HD while keeping 7HD as the primary channel simulcast.

History
The channel began airing as a separate channel on 25 September 2010, replacing 7HD as the Seven Network's only high-definition channel. The channel's first program was the 2010 AFL Grand Final, which was simulcast with an SD broadcast on the Seven Network. Following AFL coverage, the channel began airing breakaway programming, with a promotional sneak peek of upcoming programming on 7mate. The first full program to air was an episode of That '70s Show.

Upon the revival of 7HD on 10 May 2016, 7mate was reduced to standard definition. 7HD became a HD simulcast of Seven's main channel in Melbourne and Adelaide, while it simulcast 7mate in Seven's other metropolitan markets. This configuration allowed upcoming AFL matches to be broadcast in HD in all markets.

7HD was temporarily changed to a simulcast of Seven's primary channel in Sydney, Brisbane and Perth on 5 August 2016 to allow the 2016 Summer Olympics to be broadcast in high definition in all capital cities; leaving 7mate in standard definition only. However, 7HD was reverted to its former state as a 7mate simulcast in Sydney, Brisbane and Perth on 22 August 2016 after the conclusion of the Olympics. On 16 December 2016, 7HD was shifted to a simulcast of Seven's primary channel in Sydney, Brisbane and Perth to allow the Summer of Tennis to be telecast in high definition in all capital cities; leaving 7mate in SD. This change was not reverted, with Seven instead using breakaway programming on 7HD to broadcast AFL matches on 7mate in HD.

In October 2019, Seven promised 7mate would switch to HD by 2020. On 29 December 2019, it was later revealed that a HD simulcast of 7mate would replace 7food network from 16 January 2020.

On 10 July 2020, 7mate unveiled their new logo for the first time since its launch in 2010, effectively making it in line with Seven and 7two, which only used one colour in both of their logos. The outlining from the logo was removed and the word "mate" is now in a different font.

On 6 July 2022, 7mate HD relaunched in Seven Regional areas.

On 30 November 2022, 7mate SD (Channel 73) went off the air. Going to this version of 7mate would show a message to watch on Channel 74 (7mate HD), also mentioning people might need to re-scan their TV. Two weeks later on 14 December 2022, the 7mate retune placeholder disappeared.

Programming
The channel is targeting a demographic of 15- to 55-year-old males, after the success of the Seven Network with 7two with females 35+ and 25+ demographics respectively. Programs aired on the channel are a mix of repeated shows that moved from the Seven Network or 7two, programs that would make their free-to-air debut and brand new shows to Australian television.  Seven and 7TWO now target its 55+ demographic.

Shows that moved from other Seven channels include new seasons of Family Guy, American Dad! and The Amazing Race. Repeated seasons of Scrubs, Last Comic Standing, Air Crash Investigations, 30 Rock, That '70s Show, Lost and How I Met Your Mother also moved to 7mate. Mighty Ships, of which three episodes aired as one-off specials on the Seven Network, moved as a regular series to 7mate.

In 2012, the Seven Network introduced new weekday morning blocks of children's programming to air both 7two and 7mate. Branded as K-Zone, the 7mate block featured male-skewing Disney series such as Phineas and Ferb, Kick Buttowski: Suburban Daredevil, Pair of Kings and Zeke and Luther, while the 7two block aired female-skewing programs branded as Total Girl.

Programs making their free-to-air debut include Eastbound and Down, Monster Garage, Jersey Shore,  Gene Simmons Family Jewels and Punk'd. Various series which have debuts on this channel include The Equalizer, Warehouse 13 and Caprica. Additionally, the channel would feature a number of sporting events. From 2012, all AFL matches are broadcast live on 7mate in New South Wales, Australia and Queensland, Australia.

On 29 February 2016, 7mate removed all children's programming from its schedule and it was moved to another digital channel 7flix and this programming block was replaced with lifestyle fishing shows.

7mate's local production Bogan Hunters premiered to the channel's highest ratings for a non-sport program on 13 May 2014.

On 28 February 2018, 7mate started airing The Simpsons every Wednesday night after Network Ten had the rights to the show through Fox Corporation since 1991.

Futurama was also added to 7mate in 2019, returning to the Seven Network as part of a deal with FOX and after a long absence since its final broadcast on Seven in 2004.

The network also has ongoing content new and classic film and television brands from Warner Bros. Pictures, New Line Cinema, 20th Century Studios, Marvel Studios, Lucasfilm, Sony Pictures and Universal Pictures.

Original programming

Current programming

Adult animation

 American Dad! (Shared with 7flix)
 Family Guy (Shared with 7flix)
 The Cleveland Show

Comedy
 Housos: The Thong Warrior 
 Fat Pizza: Back in Business
 Rude Tube

Drama
 Terminator: The Sarah Connor Chronicles

Documentary

 Car Crash TV
 Catch It Keep It
 Deadly Down Under
 MythBusters
 Ultimate Factories
 What Went Down

Lifestyle

 Adventure Angler
 Blokesworld
 Hook, Line and Sinker
 Mark Berg's Fishing Addiction
 My Fishing Place
 River to Reef
 The Last Cast

Reality

 American Hoggers
 Big Rig Bounty Hunters
 Black Gold
 Counting Cars
 Deadliest Catch
 Flipping Ships
 Hardcore Pawn
 Ice Road Truckers
 Ink Master
 Iron Resurrection
 Jesse James: Outlaw Garage
 Meteorite Men
 Outback Truckers
 The Weekend Prospector
 Merv Hughes Fishing
 Pawn Stars
 Restoration Garage
 Swamp People
 Texas Car Wars
 Texas Metal
 World's Craziest Fools

Factual

 Desert Collectors
 Highway Patrol
 Towies

Sport

 LPL Pro
 National Football League
 NFL 100 Greatest
 Rollin' Thunder
 Summer Olympic Games
 Winter Olympic Games
 Commonwealth Games

Former programming

Adult animation

 Futurama (Now on 7flix)
 Happy Tree Friends
 Regular Old Bogan
 The Simpsons   (Shared with 7flix, Now on 7flix and Disney+)

Children's (2012–2016)

 A.N.T. Farm (2012–14)
 Austin & Ally (2013–14, 2016)
 Crash & Bernstein (2015)
 Dog with a Blog (2014)
 Fish Hooks (2012–16)
 Good Luck Charlie (2014)
 Gravity Falls (2014–16)
 I Didn't Do It (2015)
 I'm in the Band (2012–14)
 Jessie (2016)
 Kick Buttowski: Suburban Daredevil (2012–16)
 Kickin' It (2015)
 Lab Rats (2015)
 Pair of Kings (2012–15)
 Phineas and Ferb (2012–15)
 PrankStars (2013–15)
 Randy Cunningham: 9th Grade Ninja (2015)
 Shake It Up (2014)
 So Random! (2014–15)
 Star Wars Rebels (2014–16)
 Stitch! (2012–13)
 Ultimate Spider-Man (2013–15)
 Win, Lose or Draw (2015)
 Zeke and Luther (2012–15)

Preschool (2012–2016)

 Art Attack (2014–16)
 Doc McStuffins (2014–16)
 Jake and the Never Land Pirates (2012–16)
 Handy Manny (2012–16)
 Henry Hugglemonster (2014–16)
 Mickey Mouse Clubhouse (2014–16)
 Sheriff Callie's Wild West (2015–16)
 Sofia the First (2014–16)

Comedy

 30 Rock (moved to ABC Comedy)
 According to Jim
 Beavis and Butt-Head
 The Big Bang Theory (moved to 9Go! later on 10 Peach)
 Black-ish
 Chappelle's Show
 The Chasers War on Everything
 CNNNN
 Crank Yankers
 Crazy Like a Fox
 The Drew Carey Show
 Eastbound & Down
 Gary Unmarried
 Housos
 How I Met Your Mother (moved to 7flix)
 It’s Always Sunny in Philadelphia
 The Jeff Foxworthy Show
 Just Shoot Me!
 Malcolm & Eddie
 McHale's Navy
 My Name Is Earl
 Married...With Children (moved to 7flix)
 My Wife and Kids
 Ned and Stacey
 NewsRadio
 Parks and Recreation
 Scrubs
 Seinfeld (moved to 7flix, then 10 Peach)
 That '70s Show (moved to ABC2, later on 9Go!)

Drama

 Adam-12
 Airwolf
 Alias Smith and Jones
 The A-Team
 Baywatch
 Boston Legal
 Buck Rogers in the 25th Century
 The Cape
 Caprica
 Charlie's Angels
 Covert Affairs
 The Event
 The Equalizer
 FlashForward
 Hercules: The Legendary Journeys
 The Incredible Hulk
 Knight Rider
 Lost
 Magnum, P.I.
 Miami Vice
 Mickey Spillane's Mike Hammer
 No Ordinary Family
 Once Upon A Time (moved to 7flix)
 Quantum Leap
 Quincy, M.E.
 Riptide
 Rizzoli & Isles
 The Rockford Files
 Simon & Simon
 The Six Million Dollar Man
 Sons and Daughters (same channel as Channel 7 and 7two)
 The Sopranos
 Stargate: Atlantis
 Starsky & Hutch
 Suits
 S.W.A.T.
 T.J. Hooker
 V.I.P.
 The Virginian
 Wagon Train
 Warehouse 13
 Xena: Warrior Princess

Documentary

 America's Hardest Prisons
 Bogan Hunters
 Dream Car Garage
 Air Crash Investigations (moved to 7two)
 Trapped
 Verminators

Light entertainment

 Kinne
 Last Comic Standing
 ScreenPLAY
 World's Craziest Fools

News and current affairs
 NBC Meet the Press (moved to 7two)
 NBC Today (moved to 7two)

Reality

 The Amazing Race (moved to 7flix)
 America's Toughest Jobs
 American Pickers
 American Restoration
 Aussie Pickers
 Auction Kings
 Bogan Hunters
 Gene Simmons Family Jewels
 Is It Real?
 Jail
 Jersey Shore
 Mounted in Alaska
 Operation Repo (moved to 10 Bold)
 Outback Truckers
 Pimp My Ride
 Pawn Stars Australia
 Punk’d
 Wipeout USA (season 2-3 repeats)

Factual
 Air Cops

Sport

 Shannons Legends of Motorsport
 SportsFan Clubhouse
 Supercars Championship
 WWE Afterburn
 X Games Sydney (2018)

Other

 Bid America
 Big!
 Building The Ultimate
 D.E.A
 Jetpack Nation
 The Kingdom
 Motor Mate
 NWA: On Fire
 Project Xtreme
 Robot Wars
 Selling Big
 Style in Steel
 Turtleman
 Ultimate Sprintcar
 Zoom TV

It was announced on 28 April 2011 that, from 2012 to 2016, 7mate would air a minimum of four live AFL matches each round into the NSW/ACT and Queensland markets, thus going head-to-head with the Nine Network's NRL live coverage on Friday nights.

News
7mate airs Seven News updates that air on the main Seven channel and from 7TWO. All national news updates are across any state.

Sport
7mate televises live AFL coverage into New South Wales and Queensland, where rugby league is the more dominant sport, and Western Australia, due to the time difference. Some matches may be televised after midnight, or not shown at all, as the current AFL contract requires the local teams (i.e. Sydney Swans/Greater Western Sydney Giants, Brisbane Lions/Gold Coast Suns and West Coast Eagles/Fremantle Dockers) to be televised live (or, in the case of Western Australia, on a three-hour delay) into their respective states. 7mate was also the exclusive broadcaster of the International Rules Series to Australian audiences.

During the AFL season, the Supercars Championship airs on 7mate in Melbourne, Adelaide and Perth if there are AFL matches being televised at the same time.

7mate also exclusively broadcast all matches of the 2013 Rugby League World Cup.

It was announced in November 2013 that 7mate have picked up the rights to televise the 2014 Hopman Cup, after Network Ten decided to discontinue its association with the event after three editions.

The 2013–14 LFL Australia season of Legends Football League aired on 7mate.

7mate would broadcast South Australian National Football League games from 2014 as part of the Seven Network's three-year deal to exclusively broadcast the SANFL. After being with the ABC since 1993, this marks the leagues return to commercial television for the first time in 22 years.

On 15 June 2014, it was announced by Reggie Bush on Sunrise that the Seven Network had agreed to a five-year deal to broadcast the NFL. That deal was extended for another three years in 2022. Under the new deal, the network's live and free coverage deal will continue across the 2022, 2023 and 2024 seasons.

Since 2015, 7mate has been used to continue Seven's coverage of sport when the main Seven channel breaks for its nightly news bulletin such as with the Australian Open tennis (until 2018) or cricket (from 2019).

In August 2016, 7mate broadcast the 2016 Summer Olympics from Rio de Janeiro.

In April 2018, 7mate broadcast the 2018 Commonwealth Games from the Gold Coast.

Seven, and by extension 7Mate, is the new free-to-air home of cricket in Australia in conjunction with Foxtel. This ended Nine's famous 45-year run as the exclusive Cricket broadcaster and also this ended Ten's famous 5-year run as the exclusive Big Bash League broadcaster. The network will televise all Men's international tests matches, 43 Big Bash League Matches, all women's Internationals and 23 Women's Big Bash League Matches. The six-year deal starts in 2018/19 and runs until 2023/24.

In 2021, 7mate broadcast the 2020 Summer Olympics from Tokyo.

Availability
7mate is available in standard definition in metropolitan areas through Seven Network owned-and-operated stations: ATN Sydney, HSV Melbourne, BTQ Brisbane, SAS Adelaide and TVW Perth. Additionally in Sydney, Brisbane and Perth, 7mate is simulcast in high definition via breakaway programming for the AFL on 7HD. Seven-owned STQ Queensland broadcasts 7mate in HD only as it does not carry 7mate in SD.

Regional affiliates continue to broadcast 7mate as a standalone multichannel in high definition; GWN7 in regional and remote areas of Western Australia, where 7mate is broadcast on logical channel number 63. QQQ in Remote Eastern & Central Australia also broadcasts 7mate as a standalone multichannel in high definition on channel 70.  Prime7 in most regional areas of NSW/ACT, Victoria and the Gold Coast Region of Queensland has broadcast 7mate in standard definition on channel 63 since launching Prime7 HD on channel 60. Southern Cross Television also broadcasts 7mate in standard definition through GTS/BKN Spencer Gulf/Broken Hill on channel 63, TNT Tasmania and TND Darwin on channel 73 since launching Southern Cross HD on channel 60 and 70 respectively.

7mate HD
A full-time high definition simulcast of 7mate launched on 16 January 2020. The service broadcasts in 1080i HD in an MPEG-4 format on digital channel 74, replacing the previously closed 7food network. The channel is available on the Seven Network's owned-and-operated stations, ATN Sydney, HSV Melbourne, BTQ Brisbane, SAS Adelaide, TVW Perth, STQ Queensland, CBN Canberra & Southern NSW, AMV Victoria & NEN Northern NSW.

Logo and identity history

Following the launch, the logo used the generic Seven logo in a blue colour scheme, with the word "mate" being added next to it and a black outline was also included as well. It was announced on 16 December 2019 that 7mate would go HD on 16 January 2020, following the closure of 7food network.

On 10 July 2020, just 15 days before 7's multichannel rebrand, 7mate unveiled their new logo for the first time since the channel begin transmission in 2010. The outlining from the logo was removed and the word "mate" is now in a different font.

Slogans
2010–2016: Man's Best Friend
2010–present: Maaaaaaattttteee
2020–present: The Best Channel in The World Ever.

See also

List of digital television channels in Australia

Notes

References

External links

Seven Network
Digital terrestrial television in Australia
English-language television stations in Australia
Television channels and stations established in 2010
Men's mass media
Men's interest channels
2010 establishments in Australia